Hans Beck (25 April 1911 – 11 April 1996) was a Norwegian ski jumper who won a silver medal in the large hill individual event at the 1932 Winter Olympics in Lake Placid, New York. Having been in the lead after the first round, he was overcome by Birger Ruud, who hailed from the same city, in the second round.

Born in Kongsberg, he represented Kongsberg IF. He married in 1949, and had two children. After his active career he worked as a seller of sports gear.

References 

1911 births
1996 deaths
Olympic ski jumpers of Norway
Olympic silver medalists for Norway
Ski jumpers at the 1932 Winter Olympics
People from Kongsberg
Olympic medalists in ski jumping
Medalists at the 1932 Winter Olympics
Kongsberg IF ski jumpers
Norwegian male ski jumpers
Sportspeople from Viken (county)
20th-century Norwegian people